HMIS Narbada (U40) was a Modified Bittern class sloop, later known as the Black Swan class, which served in the Royal Indian Navy (RIN) during World War II.

Narbada was transferred to Pakistan in 1948 after the Partition of India, and served as PNS Jhelum.

History
HMIS Narbada was ordered in 1940 as a part of the 1940 Build Program for the Royal Indian Navy. She was built by John I. Thornycroft & Company and commissioned in 1943.

With World War II underway, she was deployed as an escort to multiple Allied convoys en route to Bombay. Upon arrival, she joined the Eastern Fleet. In 1944, she was deployed for defence of military convoys in the Bay of Bengal.

Jumna and Narbada engaged Japanese batteries up the Kaladan River near Ponnagyun.

On 13 January 1945, with the task force under attack by Japanese aircraft, Narbada downed an Oscar aircraft of the Imperial Japanese Army Air Force. She was hit aft by return fire, but continued operations. In March, she returned to Bombay for a refit and to repair damages.

The next month, in May, she was deployed with HMIS Cauvery, HMIS Godavari, HMIS Kistna, HMIS Sutlej and HMIS Hindustan to intercept Japanese troops withdrawing from the Andamans. In July, Narbada was a part of the planned force for Operation Zipper and conducted preparatory exercises, before the postponement of the operation.

At the end of World War II, after the Surrender of Japan, she sailed to Andaman waters and her commanding officer Martin Henry St. Leger Nott accepted the surrender of the Japanese Brigadier in command of the Car Nicobar garrison onboard the ship.

After the Independence of India and the subsequent Partition, she was among the vessels transferred to Pakistan, where she was renamed HMPS Jhelum and subsequently, PNS Jhelum.  She was scrapped in 1959.

Notes

References
 

Black Swan-class sloops of the Royal Indian Navy
Black Swan-class sloops of the Pakistan Navy
1942 ships
India–Pakistan military relations
Ships built by John I. Thornycroft & Company